David A. Whittaker (born November 11, 1952) is an American sound effects editor. He was nominated at the 69th Academy Awards for the film Daylight for the category of Best Sound Editing, he shared his nomination with Richard L. Anderson.

He has over 150 credits to date.

References

External links
 

American sound editors
Living people
1952 births
People from Long Beach, California